152P/Helin–Lawrence is a periodic comet in the Solar System.

The comet came to perihelion on 9 July 2012, and reached about apparent magnitude 17.

References

External links 
 Orbital simulation from JPL (Java) / Horizons Ephemeris
 152P/Helin-Lawrence – Seiichi Yoshida @ aerith.net
 Elements and Ephemeris for 152P/Helin-Lawrence – Minor Planet Center
 152P at Kronk's Cometography

Periodic comets
0152
152P
19930517